John Edward Gordon (5 February 1850 – 19 February 1915) was a British Conservative Party politician.

The eldest son of Edward Gordon, Baron Gordon of Drumearn, a senior Scottish judge and Conservative politician, he was educated at Edinburgh Academy and the University of Edinburgh. In 1879, he married Elizabeth Anna Gordon (1851–1925), the daughter of John Snowdon Henry, a former member of parliament for South East Lancashire. The couple had five children.

He was elected at the 1895 general election as the Member of Parliament (MP) for Elginshire and Nairnshire, defeating the Liberal MP John Keay. He was re-elected in 1900, but did not defend the seat again.

At the 1906 general election, he stood in the two-seat Brighton constituency having moved to Hove on the south coast of England which then formed part of the same seat. He came fourth, albeit in a close contest, and did not stand again until the Brighton by-election in June 1911. He was returned unopposed to fill the vacancy caused when the sitting MP Walter Rice was elevated to the peerage on inheriting the title of Baron Dynevor. However, he resigned the seat three years later due to ill health, on 23 June 1914, by accepting the post of Steward of the Manor of Northstead.

He died in a nursing home in Bromley, Kent, in February 1915 aged 65. In 1907, his wife moved to Japan and is buried on Mount Koya.

References

External links 
 

1850 births
1915 deaths
People educated at Edinburgh Academy
Conservative Party (UK) MPs for English constituencies
Scottish Tory MPs (pre-1912)
UK MPs 1895–1900
UK MPs 1900–1906
UK MPs 1910–1918